The 1920 Furman Purple Hurricane football team represented the Furman University during the 1920 Southern Intercollegiate Athletic Association football season. Led by sixth-year head coach Billy Laval, the Purple Hurricane compiled an overall record of 9–1 with a mark of 3–1 in SIAA play.

Schedule

References

Furman
Furman Paladins football seasons
Furman Purple Hurricane football